Ardo Arusaar (born 24 June 1988 in Pärnu) is an Estonian Greco-Roman wrestler. He competed in the Greco-Roman 96 kg event at the 2012 Summer Olympics; after defeating Erwin Caraballo in the qualifications, he was eliminated by Tsimafei Dzeinichenka in the 1/8 finals.  At the 2016 Olympics, he competed in the Greco-Roman 98 kg event.  He lost to Islam Magomedov in the last 16.

References

External links
 

1988 births
Living people
Estonian male sport wrestlers
Olympic wrestlers of Estonia
Wrestlers at the 2012 Summer Olympics
Wrestlers at the 2016 Summer Olympics
Sportspeople from Pärnu
Wrestlers at the 2015 European Games
European Games competitors for Estonia
21st-century Estonian people